The Fauvel AV.22 was an unorthodox glider produced in France in the 1950s, 60s, and 70s. Originally intended to be produced in series, it was later marketed to homebuilders. Like other Charles Fauvel designs, it was a tailless aircraft, and this particular design featured wings with a slight forward sweep.

Design and development
The original AV.22 design was unpowered, but later versions were equipped with an engine mounted in the nose for self-launching. The AV.22 was entered in a 1959 competition to select a standard glider for the French aeroclubs, but lost to the Wassmer Bijave.

The first powered version was the AV.221, which flew on 8 April 1965. In addition to the powerplant, the fuselage was also redesigned to accommodate a passenger side-by-side with the pilot. A simplified version of this aircraft was marketed for homebuilding as the AV.222, with options including a choice of airfoils, and either one or two wheel undercarriage.

Variants

AV.22Initial glider version;first flight 8 April 1956. Two prototypes and four production aircraft were built
AV.22S Production version of the AV.22 glider.
AV.221Two-seat motor glider, powered by a  Rectimo 4 AR 1200 engine.
AV.221BA proposed variant powered by a  Survol - de Coucy "Pygmée" engine.
AV.222Simplified AV.221 for homebuilding;first flight May 1992.

Specifications (AV.22S / AV.222)

See also

References

Notes

Bibliography

 
 

1950s French sailplanes
Fauvel aircraft
Tailless aircraft
Homebuilt aircraft
Motor gliders
Single-engined tractor aircraft
Mid-wing aircraft
Aircraft first flown in 1956